{{Infobox person
| name               = Janvi Chheda
| image              = JanviChheda.jpg
| caption            = Chheda in 2012
| birth_name         = 
| birth_date         = 29 February
| birth_place        = Mumbai, Maharashtra
| occupation         = Actress
| known_for          = Chhoona Hai AasmaanCID| years_active       = 2005-2018
| spouse             = 
| children           = 1
}}

Janvi Chheda Gopalia is an Indian actress who primarily works in Hindi television. She made her acting debut in 2007 with Chhoona Hai Aasmaan portraying Sameera Singh. Chheda is best known for her portrayal of Sugna Shyam Singh in Balika Vadhu and Sub-Inspector Shreya in CID, which earned her wider recognition.

Early life
Chheda was born on 29 February and was brought up in Mumbai. She is a Gujarati whose native place is Mandvi, Kutch. She completed her graduation from MKS Ritambhara, Mumbai.

Career
Debut and breakthrough (2005-2011)
Chheda started her career with a play Dr. Mukta in Dubai. She made her film debut in 2005 with the Gujarati film Toh Lagi Sharat playing Sanjana and worked in Gujarati television as host in Kem Cho and as Nidhi in Saubhagyavati.

Chheda made her Hindi TV debut with Chhoona Hai Aasmaan portraying Flight Lieutenant Sameera Singh opposite Mohammed Iqbal Khan from 2007 to 2008. The show received praises for its storyline.

In 2009, she played the negative character of Sandhya in Dhoop Mein Thandi Chaav...Maa alongside Vineet Raina. She appeared as Simran in Maayka in 2009.

From 2010 to 2011, she portrayed the lead Tashi Arjun Singh alongside Karan Hukku and Kunal Verma in Tera Mujhse Hai Pehle Ka Naata Koi.

Success and break from acting (2012-2018)
From 2011 to 2013, she portrayed Sugna Shyam Singh opposite Sachin Shroff in Balika Vadhu, which proved as a major turning point in her career.

Chheda is widely known for her portrayal of Sub-Inspector Shreya in India's longest-running television police procedural CID. It earned her wider recognition. She portrayed the character from 2012 to 2016.

She also appeared as Shreya in the crossover episodes with Adaalat during CID Viruddh Adaalat in 2012 and with Taarak Mehta Ka Ooltah Chashmah in 2014.

She returned as Shreya in CID in 2018 for two episodes, which also marked her last screen appearance before she took a break from acting.

Personal life
Chheda married her long-time boyfriend Nishant Gopalia in 2011. She gave birth to a daughter Nirvi in 2017.

Filmography
Television

Films

Play
 Dr. Mukta in Dubai'' (2005) alongside Jaya Bachchan

See also
 List of Indian television actresses

References

External links

Living people
Indian soap opera actresses
Indian television actresses
Gujarati people
Kutchi people
People from Kutch district
People from Mandvi
Year of birth missing (living people)